Eurotium is a genus of fungi belonging to the family Trichocomaceae.

The genus was first described by Heinrich Friedrich Link in 1809.

References

Trichocomaceae
Eurotiomycetes genera
Taxa named by Johann Heinrich Friedrich Link